Kennedy Brooks (born October 8, 1998) is an American football running back for the Philadelphia Eagles of the National Football League (NFL). He played college football at Oklahoma.

Early years
Brooks attended Mansfield High School in Mansfield, Texas. During his high school career he had 7,658 yards and 96 touchdowns. As a senior in 2016, he was the recipient of the Landry Award as the top player in the Dallas-Fort Worth metroplex. He committed to the University of Oklahoma to play college football.

College career
Kennedy missed his first season at Oklahoma in 2017 with a shoulder injury and redshirted. He returned from the injury in 2018, to rush for 1,056 yards on 119 carries with 12 touchdowns.

College statistics

Professional career

On April 30, 2022, Brooks was signed as an undrafted free agent by the Philadelphia Eagles following the 2022 NFL Draft. He was waived on August 30, 2022 and signed to the practice squad the next day. He was released on November 29. He signed a reserve/future contract on January 19, 2023.

References

External links
 Philadelphia Eagles bio
Oklahoma Sooners bio

Living people
1998 births
People from Mansfield, Texas
Players of American football from Texas
Sportspeople from the Dallas–Fort Worth metroplex
American football running backs
Oklahoma Sooners football players
Philadelphia Eagles players